Peter Simple was the third racehorse in history to win the Grand National steeplechase twice, emulating The Duke and Abd-El-Kader. After winning in 1849 the horse failed to complete the course during the next three years before winning again in 1853 at the age of 15, the oldest ever winner.

Peter Simple was a 9/1 shot in his 1853 victory at Aintree and was trained by Tom Olliver who was also the jockey.  Josey Little was the owner.

References

National Hunt racehorses
Grand National winners
Racehorses trained in the United Kingdom
Racehorses bred in the United Kingdom
Non-Thoroughbred racehorses
1838 racehorse births